The 1995 A-League season was the sixth A-League season and first after being renamed from the American Professional Soccer League.

Overview
In 1995, the American Professional Soccer League, which was the de facto highest level of U.S. soccer (officially sanctioned U.S. second division) until MLS commenced, changed its name to the A-League. The league had ended its 1994 season with seven teams and intended to expand to ten for the 1995 season with new franchises in Detroit and Atlanta. These plans were stymied when the Fort Lauderdale Strikers, Los Angeles Salsa and Toronto Rockets all folded. This left the league with only four teams. The addition of the New York Centaurs and Atlanta Ruckus gave the league six teams and allowed it to compete for another season.  Training camps opened in March and the season began on May 5, 1995, when the Vancouver 86ers defeated the Atlanta Ruckus.  By the time the regular season ended on September 10, 1995, the Montreal Impact had topped the chart. However, they were eliminated in the first round of the playoffs by the Ruckus.  Seattle defeated Vancouver in the first round, then defeated Atlanta in the final to take their first championship.  The league introduced a new scoring system for the regular season.  No games ended in a tie. If the score was tied at the end of regulation, every game went to a shootout. A win gained a team three points, a shootout win two points, a shootout loss one point and a loss zero points.

Regular season

Playoffs

Bracket

Semifinals 1

The Atlanta Ruckus advance to the finals.

Semifinals 2

The Seattle Sounders advance to the finals.

Final

The Seattle Sounders win the A-League title.

Points leaders

Honors
 MVP: Peter Hattrup
 Leading goal scorer: Peter Hattrup
 Leading goalkeeper: Marcus Hahnemann
 Rookie of the Year: Giuliano Oliviero
 Coach of the Year: Lothar Osiander
 Defender of the Year: John Doyle
 Official of the Year: Esfandiar Baharmast
 First Team All League
Goalkeeper: Marcus Hahnemann
Defenders: Robin Fraser, John Doyle, Steve Trittschuh
Midfielders: Dan Calichman, Paul Dougherty, Geoff Aunger, Peter Hattrup, Giuliano Oliviero
Forwards: Lloyd Barker, Staale Soebye

References

External links
 The Year in American Soccer – 1995
 USA – A-League (American Professional Soccer League) (RSSSF)

	

1995 in American soccer leagues
1995 in Canadian soccer
1995